Bradley Thomas Cole (born February 11, 1959) is an American actor.

Early years
Singer-songwriter, actor, and producer, Bradley "Brad" Cole was born and raised in Southern California. He began guitar lessons at 8 years old and was heavily influenced by rock and soul music from the 1960s and 70s. He played in various rock bands throughout his teen and high school years in California.

Cole studied drama and business at Pepperdine University in Malibu, California where he also played baseball. He hoped to play professionally until an injury put that dream aside, and he turned his focus to acting and his music.
Cole won the "Best Actor" award for his performance in "One Flew Over The Cuckoo's Nest". He then traveled to Europe where played solo and in groups in clubs and small venues there.

Career
While in Paris, France, Cole founded a theater company, "La Version Originale", where he performed in classic American dramas such as "Who's Afraid of Virginia Woolf", as well as original plays which he authored and for which he composed the music. He continued pursuing songwriting and music and played in bands in Paris as well as in other European cities. During this time he was offered many roles in both French and American TV and film including the made-for-television movies Jewels and The Sun Also Rises, feature films Sweet Revenge, Touch and Die and 5 Days in June and the international soap "Riviera". He is most known in France for his portrayal of Daniel Green on the popular "cult" sitcom "Les Filles d'à Côté".

In the late 90s, Cole traveled to Nashville, Tennessee to record his first album of original compositions. The album was released in Europe and is scheduled for a re-release in 2022. In the early 2000s, he was noticed by casting director Glenn Daniels and was cast in the long-running soap opera "The Guiding Light" to play the dual characters of "Prince Richard" and "Jeffrey O'Neil", the love interest of "Reva Shayne", played by 5 time Emmy winner Kim Zimmer in New York City, a stint that lasted for over 10 years. The role(s) garnered him a Soap Digest Award nomination and best supporting actor Emmy pre-nomination and he topped the fan voter polls in CBS Soap Digest magazine numerous times.

During his time in New York, Cole recorded and released 3 more albums of original music and toured extensively across America playing mostly in small clubs and venues coast to coast. While in New York he also performed in off-Broadway theater as well as roles in productions of Shakespeare in Princeton, New Jersey. His music has been recently uploaded to social media platforms and can be found on Spotify and Apple I-Tunes as well as YouTube. After the birth of his second child, Cole took an extended break from the entertainment industry to be a stay-at-home dad. In 2021 he returned to television guest starring on the French soap "Les Mysteres De L'Amour" ("The Mysteries of Love").

Family life
He and his wife, Yasuko, are the parents of son Sean William and daughter Maya Joan.

Television roles
General Hospital as Warren Bauer (2010)
Guiding Light as Jeffrey O'Neill (2003–2009)
All My Children as Jordan Roberts (January 2 & 3, 2003)
Guiding Light as Richard Winslow (1999–2003)
Les Vacances de l'Amour as Paul Richardson (1998)
Les Filles d'à Côté as Daniel Green (1993–1994)
Maguy as Tony (1992)
Les Cinq Dernières Minutes (season 2, episode 55 : Pour qui sonne le jazz) as Inspecteur Jackson (1988)
Les Cinq Dernières Minutes (season 2, episode 14 : Tilt) as Red (1985)

Go to IMDB for complete list https://www.imdb.com/name/nm0170461/

References

External links

Bradley Cole's Official Website
Bradley Cole's actor profile at soapcentral.com

1959 births
Living people
Male actors from Los Angeles County, California
American male soap opera actors
American male television actors